The River Delvin is a river of northern County Dublin, about  long and forming much of the Dublin-Meath boundary; it is thus largely under the responsibility of Fingal County Council, sometimes shared with Meath County Council.

Name
Delvin or An Ailbhine is derived from Old Irish ailbine, possibly from ollbine, that is "great crime." The river is also sometimes known as the Elvene, Elvin Water, Elvin or Delvyn.

Course

The Delvin rises north west of the village of Garristown, and receives the Bartramstown River, which rises in County Meath and passes near the Fourknocks monument.  The Delvin passes Garristown, from which the Garristown Stream joins, and flows northeast, forming much of the Dublin-Meath county boundary. It passes along the northern edge of the village of Naul, where there are cliffs of around 20 metres, a 5 metre natural fall, and a small private hydro-electric plant on an artificial cascade.  The river near Naul is sometimes known as the Roche.  

Downstream of Naul, small tributaries flow in.  The river runs east, then north, passing Stamullen, then east again, crossing into the broad Gormanston area.  It passes under the M1 motorway, where is marks the county boundary, and later receives a final tributary and flows under a viaduct to enter the Irish Sea at Knocknagin, at the southern end of Gormanston beach, south of Ben Head and some distance north of the village of Bremore, and the town of Balbriggan.

The Delvin has more than a dozen tributaries, including the Bartramstown River, Stablestown Stream, and Silver Stream.  It once powered at least one mill, and today there is at least one small hydroelectric plant on its course.  The main river body runs for about 18km, while tributary lines total at least 10km more.

Fishing
Trout fishing on these rivers takes place from February to September. Trout fishing is usually catch and release; spinner reel fishing on one shore is allowed.  Most trout are in the 2 pound range.

See also
Rivers of Ireland

References

External links

Rivers of County Dublin
Rivers of County Meath
Landforms of Fingal